The Verdict Is Yours was an American courtroom drama that aired on CBS Daytime from September 2, 1957, to September 28, 1962, and in primetime from July 3 to September 25, 1958.

Overview

The Verdict Is Yours premiered on September 2, 1957. It was a part of the daytime lineup of CBS. Unscripted, it featured actual lawyers playing the lawyers and judge. Likewise, the defendants and witnesses on the program were professional actors who, although they were given a general outline of what they were supposed to say, ad-libbed their actual dialogue. Sportscaster Jim McKay was the original reporter, providing commentary on the trials. He was succeeded in 1960 by newsman Bill Stout. The program aired weekly on CBS’ nighttime schedule in July 1958. The studio audience served as the jury.

The cases all took place in Overlook, a fictional town.

The British Crown Court (TV series), though scripted, had a Jury composed of real members of the public, who reached their own verdicts.

Cast
 David Ensor served as the judge on most episodes.
 Robert Rietty served as an attorney on most episodes.
 Madeline Large served as an attorney on most episodes.

Reception
According to Christopher Schemering in The Soap Opera Encyclopedia, "Legal groups across the country applauded the program's realism. TV Guide found it 'contrived' but 'fascinating.'"

References

External links

Court shows
Television series by CBS Studios
1957 American television series debuts
1962 American television series endings
1950s American drama television series
1960s American drama television series
CBS original programming